Merthiolate may refer to:
Thimerosal, a mercury-containing antiseptic discovered in 1927
Chlorhexidine digluconate solution, marketed by Hypermarcas under the name "Merthiolate"
Benzalkonium chloride solution (Cloruro de benzalconio, tintura), distributed by Bayer de México under the name "merthiolate"
Benzalkonium chloride and red dye solution, marketed by DLC Laboratories, Inc. of Paramount, California, as a mercury-free skin antiseptic under the name "Merthiolate" (brand name: De La Cruz)